Kindred Paul (born February 22, 1996) is a Canadian water polo player from Alberta.  She is a member of the Canada women's national water polo team. She will participate in the 2020 Summer Olympics.

She participated at the 2016 FINA Women's Water Polo World League, 2018 FINA Women's Water Polo World League, 2019 FINA Women's Water Polo World League, 2021 FINA Women's Water Polo World League, and 2018 FINA Women's Water Polo World Cup. 

She played for University of California, Berkeley. 

In June 2021, Paul was named to Canada's 2020 Summer Olympics team.

References 

1996 births
Living people
People from Spruce Grove
Canadian female water polo players
Pan American Games medalists in water polo
Pan American Games silver medalists for Canada
Medalists at the 2019 Pan American Games
Water polo players at the 2019 Pan American Games
Water polo players at the 2020 Summer Olympics
Olympic water polo players of Canada